Footfalls is a lost 1921 American silent mystery film directed by Charles Brabin and starring Tyrone Power, Sr. that was based upon the short story Footfalls by Wilbur Daniel Steele writing in Tower of Sand and Other Stories. It was produced and distributed by Fox Film Corporation.

Cast
Tyrone Power, Sr. as Hiram Scudder
Tom Douglas as Tommy Scudder
Estelle Taylor as Peggy Hawthorne
Gladden James as Alec Campbell
Nora Cecil (uncredited)

References

External links

1921 films
American silent feature films
Lost American films
Films directed by Charles Brabin
Films based on short fiction
American black-and-white films
American mystery films
1921 mystery films
Fox Film films
1921 lost films
Lost mystery films
Silent mystery films
1920s American films
Films about disability